The Hype House is a collective of teenage TikTok personalities based in Moorpark, California, as well as the name of the mansion where some of the creators live. It is a collaborative content creation house, allowing the different influencers and content creators to make videos together easily. Current members include Thomas Petrou and Mia Hayward.

The house itself is a Spanish-style mansion perched at the top of a gated street. The mansion itself includes a palatial backyard, pool, outdoor gym, jacuzzi and a large kitchen and dining quarters. The Hype House location has changed twice; the collaborative originally used a series of two different houses in Los Angeles proper before moving to their current house in Moorpark. The membership of the collaborative has also evolved over time.

History 
The collective formed in December 2019, and includes around twenty rising or established Gen Z influencers from TikTok. Most of its funding for creation came from Daisy Keech, Chase Hudson and Thomas Petrou, Charli D'Amelio, Dixie D'Amelio, and Addison Rae. During its peak in membership, it had twenty-one members until founding member Daisy Keech left in March 2020, citing internal disputes with other members as the reason for her departure. In May 2020, the D'Amelios' representative confirmed the sisters also left the collective when "The Hype House started to become more of a business." Larray, who was already an established YouTuber and TikTok personality, joined in January 2020, but confirmed in his livestream that he had left later that year. Vinnie Hacker, an internet sensation, joined the house in January 2021, which was a surprise to a lot of the Hype House's fan base. Russian model Renata Valliulina (also known as Renata Ri) joined the house in December of that year.

After being interviewed by Thomas Petrou, leader of the house, popular content creator Tabitha Swatosh was accepted into the house and became a Hype House member on January 28, 2022. Sam Dezz and Brooke Monk joined the house as of April 1, 2022. Paige Taylor officially became a member on May 14, 2022. Throughout May of 2022, the Hype House frequently collabed with Breezy Boys LA, another content house. Then, on June 3, 2022, all the previous Breezy Boy members (Ace Akers, Bryce Parker, Eddie Preciado, Jacob Day, Jackson Dean, and Kristian Ramey) became official Hype House members. As of October-November 2022, Paige Taylor, Bryce Parker, and Jackson Dean left the house. Ace Akers, Eddie Preciado, and Kristian Ramey left the house before October 2022. 
Current members include Thomas Petrou, Mia Hayward, Jacob Day, Sadie Mckenna, and Breese Maroc.

Reality series 

On April 22, 2021, Netflix announced that they would be airing a reality series at The Hype House, starring Annon, Dragun, Hacker, Hayward, Hudson, Merritt, Petrou, Warren, and Wright. Hype House premiered on Netflix on January 7, 2022.

Controversies 
On July 21, 2020, Nikita Dragun held a surprise birthday party for Larray during the COVID-19 pandemic at the Hype House mansion. The party included internet celebrities such as James Charles and others. At the time of the party, California's COVID-19 cases had just surpassed New York's cases. There was an estimated 67 people in attendance, many of whom were seen without face masks despite local health laws. Photos and videos of the event appeared on social media sites such as Instagram. These posts drew criticism from the public, including other influencers like Elijah Daniel and Tyler Oakley. Merritt, and some of the other attendees of the party later apologized. Residents of The Hype House later tested negative for COVID-19.

Lawsuit 
On January 24, 2023, the landlord of the house announced he would be suing the hype house 300k due to unpaid rent and destruction to the house.

See also 

 The Hype House (TV show)

References

External links 
 
 

2019 establishments in California
American Internet groups
American TikTok groups
Social media influencers
TikTok